The Rappensee is a mountain lake in Germany, in the Bavarian part of the Allgäu Alps. The lake is located below the Rappenseekopf near the small settlement .

Lakes of Bavaria
Tarns of the Alps